Damir Akhmetbekov (born 4 June 1975) is a Kazakhstani diver. He competed in the 1996 and 2000 Summer Olympics.

References

1975 births
Living people
Kazakhstani male divers
Divers at the 1996 Summer Olympics
Divers at the 2000 Summer Olympics
Sportspeople from Astana
Olympic divers of Kazakhstan
Divers at the 1994 Asian Games
Divers at the 1998 Asian Games
Asian Games competitors for Kazakhstan
20th-century Kazakhstani people